The Libertarian Party of Minnesota is a state affiliate of the United States Libertarian Party.

History
The Libertarian Party of Minnesota was formed in 1972 after Charles Brekke and Steve Richardson wrote to the Libertarian Party, headquartered in Colorado, requesting to charter a state group. They were joined by Frank Haws and Rich Kleinow, who were independently seeking a way to get Libertarian Party Presidential candidate Dr. John Hospers on the ballot in Minnesota.

The first meeting of the LPMN was held at Brekke's home in Minneapolis, where Ed Contoski was elected as the LPMN's first party chair, Rich Kleinow was elected vice chairman, Charles Brekke secretary, and Claudia Jenson treasurer. The original signers of the LPMN charter, considered the founders of the LPMN and the first executive committee, were:
 Ed Contoski (chair)
 Rich Kleinow (vice chair)
 Claudia Jensen (treasurer)
 Charles Brekke (secretary)
 Georgiena Brekke
 Jack Buxell
 Jane Buxell
 Franklin Haws
 Arnette Putman
 Marc Putman
 Stephen Richardson

In 1974, Rich Kleinow and Claudia Jensen were the first two candidates for the Libertarian Party of Minnesota, on the ballot for governor and lieutenant governor, respectively. Kleinow/Jensen received 1,858 votes and came in 7th place.  Dale Hemming, LPMN Chair in 1976, ran for Congress in 1976 and 1978.

Current party leadership
Party leaders are elected each year at the Libertarian Party of Minnesota's State Convention.

Executive Committee Leadership
 Charles Kuchlenz – State Party Chair
 Mason McElvain – State Party Vice Chair
 Heather Jelinek – State Party Secretary
 Joey Gamache – State Party Treasurer
 Anthony Williams – Executive Director

Executive Committee Members At-Large
 Steven Aro
 Rebecca Whiting
 Bill Sorenson
 David Brady
 Justin Merritt
 Brian Paulson
 Jason Klietz
 Dave Johnson

Current elected officials
 Maynard Meyer – Madion City Council (elected Nov 2016)
 Cara Schulz – Burnsville City Council (elected Nov 2016)
 Nick Roehl – Plymouth City Council Ward 2 (elected Nov 2018)
 Olga Parsons – Crystal City Council Section 2 (elected Nov 2018)
 Shawn Ruotsinoja – St. Bonifacious Mayor (elected Nov 2018)
 Vince Workman – Burnsville City Council (elected Nov 2018)
 Roger Parras – St. Peter Councilmember Ward 1 (elected Jan 2019)
 Scott Grotting – Independence Council Member (elected Nov 2019)

References

Libertarian Party (United States) by state
Political parties in Minnesota